All Things New may refer to:

 All Things New (band), a Contemporary Christian band
 All Things New (All Things New album), a 2013 album by the band
 All Things New (Steven Curtis Chapman album), a 2004 album by Steven Curtis Chapman
 All Things New (Rivers & Robots album), a 2014 album by Rivers & Robots